Ben Dixon (born 25 December 1934 in Gaffney, South Carolina; died 8 November 2018) was an American jazz drummer.

Dixon is best known for his contributions to many soul jazz albums on the Blue Note label led by Grant Green, Lou Donaldson and Big John Patton. He died in 2018.

Discography

As Leader 
 2000: Say Yes to Your Best (American Classical Jazz) with Adam Scone, Coleman Mellett

As sideman 
With George Braith
Laughing Soul (Prestige, 1966)
With Lou Donaldson
The Natural Soul (Blue Note, 1962)
A Man with a Horn (Blue Note, 1963)
Good Gracious! (Blue Note, 1963)
Signifyin' (Argo, 1963)
Possum Head (Argo, 1964)
Musty Rusty (Cadet, 1965)
With Ray Draper
Tuba Sounds (Prestige, 1957)
With Grant Green
Grant's First Stand (Blue Note, 1961)
Sunday Mornin' (Blue Note, 1961)
Blues for Lou (Blue Note, 1963)
Am I Blue (Blue Note, 1963)
His Majesty King Funk (Verve, 1965)
Iron City (Cobblestone, 1967)
With Johnny Hodges
Wings & Things (Verve, 1965) with Wild Bill Davis
With Richard "Groove" Holmes
Soul Power! (Prestige, 1967) 
With Joe Jones
Introducing the Psychedelic Soul Jazz Guitar of Joe Jones (Prestige, 1967)
With Jack McDuff
The Honeydripper (Prestige, 1961)
With Big John Patton
Along Came John (Blue Note, 1963)
 Blue John (Blue Note, 1963)
 The Way I Feel (Blue Note, 1964)
 Oh Baby! (Blue Note, 1965)
With Stanley Turrentine
A Chip Off the Old Block (Blue Note, 1963)With Harold VickSteppin' Out! (Blue Note, 1963)With Don WilkersonShoutin' (Blue Note, 1963)With Baby Face Willette'Face to Face (Blue Note, 1961)Stop and Listen'' (Blue Note, 1961)

References 

American jazz drummers
Soul-jazz drummers
Blue Note Records artists
1934 births
Living people
People from Gaffney, South Carolina
20th-century American drummers
American male drummers
20th-century American male musicians
American male jazz musicians